Kavi Yogi Maharishi Dr. Shuddhananda Bharati (11 May 1897 – 7 March 1990) was an Indian philosopher and poet. His teachings are focused mainly on the search for God in Self, through the Sama Yoga practice he created.

Biography 
Bharati was born in Sivaganga in South India, and attained Jeeva Samadhi in nearby Sholapuram. He spent 25 years in silence in Pondicherry from 1925 to 1950, in the Ashram of Sri Aurobindo and the Mother Mirra Alfassa. From the early 1950s to the 1970s, he lived beside the IIT near Adyar, Chennai. Bharati always lived alone, without an Ashram. He founded Shuddhananda Bharati Desiya Vidyalayam High School in 1979.

Several of Bharati's disciples contributed to the construction of the main building of the school at Sholapuram in 1992.

Works 
Bharati wrote over 250 published works: 173 in Tamil, fifty in English, ten in French, four in Hindi and three in Telugu. He was also conversational in Sanskrit, Kannada, Malayalam and Urdu. He is the first translator to have done both verse and prose renderings of the Tirukkural into English. He also translated the novels of Victor Hugo, the plays of Moliere and Racine, and Dante's Divine Comedy into Tamil.

In his magnum opus Bharata Shakti, Bharati describes his ideal of "One humanity living in communion with a single God in a world transformed". The full work includes epic texts, lyrical dramas, operas, comedies, pastoral novels, news, biographies, comments on illustrated works, essays, poems in French corrected directly by the Mother, Sacred Odes, walks, Rondels and triplets. For this work, Bharati received the Raja Rajan Award from the Tamil University in Tanjore in 1984, conferring upon him the title of Doctor of Literature.

His autobiography, The Pilgrim Soul includes encounters with well-known personalities of the past century, including Annie Besant, Sri Aurobindo, Meher Baba, Shirdi Sai Baba, V. V. S. Aiyar, Sringeri Sharada Peetham, Ramana Maharshi, C. V. Raman, Subramanya Bharathi, Sivananda, Romain Rolland, Jean Herbert and others.

In English 
 Our Religion, L'Auberson, Éditions ASSA, 171 pages, 
 Yoga for All, L'Auberson, Éditions ASSA, 152 pages, 
 The Divine Master, L'Auberson, Éditions ASSA, 162 pages, 
 The Secrets of Sadhana, L'Auberson, Éditions ASSA, 95 pages, 
 Guiding Lights, L'Auberson, Éditions ASSA, 130 pages, 
 Gospel of Perfect Life, L'Auberson, Éditions ASSA, 226 pages, 
 Cosmic Riddles, L'Auberson, Éditions ASSA, 144 pages, 
 Mystic Treasure, L'Auberson, Éditions ASSA, 230 pages, 
 Pilgrim Soul, L'Auberson, Éditions ASSA, 503 pages, 
 Mahatma Ramalingam, L'Auberson, Éditions ASSA, 164 pages, 
 Sama Yoga, L'Auberson, Éditions ASSA, 172 pages, 
 Secrets of Sama Yoga, L'Auberson, Éditions ASSA, 183 pages, 
 Tamil Sentiment, L'Auberson, Éditions ASSA, 202 pages, 
 Poet Nightingale Bharathiyar, L'Auberson, Éditions ASSA, 213 pages, 
 Sri Krishna and His Gospel, L'Auberson, Éditions ASSA, 171 pages, 
 Silambu Selvam, L'Auberson, Éditions ASSA, 369 pages, 
 Secrets of Yoga, L'Auberson, Éditions ASSA, 236 pages, 
 Alvar Saint, L'Auberson, Éditions ASSA, 165 pages, 
 Thirukkural, L'Auberson, Éditions ASSA, 185 pages, 
 The Soul sings, L'Auberson, Éditions ASSA, 157 pages, 
 The Yoga Master, L'Auberson, Éditions ASSA, 189 pages, 
 The Revelation of Saint Meikandar, L'Auberson, Éditions ASSA, 103 pages, 
 The Magic Weapon of Shiva, L'Auberson, Éditions ASSA, 145 pages, 
 The Delightful Tamil Garden, L'Auberson, Éditions ASSA, 120 pages, 
 Art Temple, L'Auberson, Éditions ASSA, 296 pages, 
 Letters of Kavi Yogi, Volume 1, L'Auberson, Éditions ASSA, 191 pages, 
 Letters of Kavi Yogi, Volume 2, L'Auberson, Éditions ASSA, 174 pages, 
 Adi Shankara Bhagavan, L'Auberson, Éditions ASSA, 193 pages, 
 Bharata Shakti, Canto one, Emanation of the Pure One, L'Auberson, Éditions ASSA, 285 pages, 
 Bharata Shakti, Canto two, Gowri Kandam, L'Auberson, Éditions ASSA, 430 pages, 
 Bharata Shakti, Canto three, Sadhana Kandam, L'Auberson, Éditions ASSA, 471 pages, 
 Bharata Shakti, Canto four, Satyan at Danavam, L'Auberson, Éditions ASSA, 371 pages, 
 Bharata Shakti, Canto five, Victory of Shuddha Shakti, L'Auberson, Éditions ASSA, 313 pages, 
 Arrival of Mira, Love story between Bhojan and Mira, L'Auberson, Éditions ASSA, 133 pages, 
 The Integral Yoga of Sri Aurobindo, Live in Yoga with the Divine, a Life Divine !, L'Auberson, Éditions ASSA, 113 pages, 
 The Secrets of Shiva, L'Auberson, Éditions ASSA, 119 pages, 
 His sixtieh birthday celebration, L'Auberson, Éditions ASSA, 131 pages, 
 Illumination Hymn and Conference, L'Auberson, Éditions ASSA, 133 pages, 
 Voice of Tayumanar, L'Auberson, Éditions ASSA, 205 pages, 
 Poet's Forum, Kavi Arangam, L'Auberson, Éditions ASSA, 144 pages, 
 The Arrival of Buddha, L'Auberson, Éditions ASSA, 101 pages, 
 Fasting and Divinity, L'Auberson, Éditions ASSA, 104 pages, 
 The Grand Epic of Saivism, L'Auberson, Éditions ASSA, 257 pages, 
 Songs for Children, L'Auberson, Éditions ASSA, 100 pages, 
 Essence of Religion, L'Auberson, Éditions ASSA, 127 pages, 
 William Blake, L'Auberson, Éditions ASSA, 104 pages, 
 Francis Thompson, L'Auberson, Éditions ASSA, 97 pages, 
 Kama Thilagan and Vanarasu, L'Auberson, Éditions ASSA, 137 pages, 
 Chariot of Life, L'Auberson, Éditions ASSA, 207 pages, 
 Vivekanandam and The Story of our Independence, L'Auberson, Éditions ASSA, 137 pages, 
 Fire of Tamil, Thamizhkanal, L'Auberson, Éditions ASSA, 207 pages, 
  Sadasiva Brahman, the Silent Sage

Biographies and sources 
 Sri Dewan Bahadur. A Study of all the works of Dr. Shuddhananda Bharati, L'Auberson, Éditions ASSA, 224 pages, 
 The best known biography of Maharishi Yogi Kavi Dr. Bharati Shuddhananda is that written in his hand in his book Pilgrim Soul Extracts of Pilgrim Soul Editions ASSA, L'Auberson, Christian Piaget, .
 Dancing with Shiva, Published by Himalayan Academy India,

See also
 List of translators into English

References

External links 
"The path to spiritual communism" Profile of Dr. Shuddhananda Bharati, Indian Express, Chennai, 14 April 1990
 Coverage of Dr. Shuddhananda Bharati's visit to South Africa
 Photo gallery of Dr. Shuddhananda Bharati

1897 births
1990 deaths
Indian spiritual teachers
20th-century Indian philosophers
People from Sivaganga district
Tamil writers
Tamil epic poems
Carnatic composers
20th-century Indian composers
Tamil–English translators
20th-century translators
Translators of the Tirukkural into English
Tirukkural translators